Omobranchus rotundiceps, is a species of combtooth blenny found in the western Pacific ocean, around Queensland, Australia.

References

rotundiceps
Taxa named by William John Macleay
Fish described in 1881